The  is an art museum in Setagaya, Tokyo, Japan.

From 1946 until 1974, Machiko Hasegawa drew the comic strip Sazae-san about an ordinary Japanese family led by a good-natured mother and wife, Sazae. The strip was a huge success and for most of its run appeared daily in the Asahi Shimbun. While entirely original and thoroughly Japanese, Sazae-san popularity in Japan is comparable to the American strip Peanuts.  Hasegawa was also an art collector, and her collection along with additions by her sister Mariko is housed in the museum. 

The museum showcases original drawings, clay dolls, and paintings, as well as works by Western and Japanese artists.

Access
Walk for about 7 minutes from Sakura-shimmachi Station in Tokyu Den-en-toshi Line via Sazae-san Street.
Located in 1-30-6 Sakurashimmachi, Setagaya-ku, Tokyo.

References

External links
  

Art museums and galleries in Tokyo
Biographical museums in Japan
Anime and manga museums in Japan